Samanyolu Haber TV was one of the Turkish national news channels broadcasting internationally. It was launched after expansion of Samanyolu TV network which included Mehtap TV (a culture oriented channel), Burc FM (a culture oriented radio channel), Yumurcak TV (a children's channel), and Dünya Radyo (an entertainment channel).
The channel is known for its closeness to Fethullah Gülen, the leader of the Gülen movement.
Samanyolu TV was an international TV station, with its headquarters in Istanbul. On 30 April 2016, its license was revoked and the channel closed by the Radio and Television Supreme Council due to alleged links with the Gülen Movement following the 2016 Turkish coup d'état attempt. It was also removed from Türksat. After this, Samanyolu Haber TV will not return along with Samanyolu TV until further notice.

References

External links

Companies formerly affiliated with the Gülen movement
Defunct television channels in Turkey
Mass media shut down in the 2016 Turkish purges
Turkish-language television stations
Television channels and stations established in 2007
Television channels and stations disestablished in 2016